Frank Marshall may refer to:

 Frank Marshall (filmmaker) (born 1946), American film producer and director
 Frank Marshall (chess player) (1877–1944), American chess master
 Frank Marshall (footballer, born 1904) (1904–1928), Scottish association football player
 Frank Marshall (footballer, born 1929) (1929–2015), English association football player and coach
 Frank Marshall (umpire) (1858–?), American professional baseball umpire
 Frank Marshall (pianist) (1883–1959), Spanish pianist and pedagogue
 Frank Marshall (referee) (1845–1906), British schoolmaster, cleric and rugby administrator
 Frank J. Marshall (engineer), investment banker and former engineer V.P. of Cisco
 Frank Marshall, Baron Marshall of Leeds (1915–1990), British lawyer and politician
 Frank Marshall (photographer) (born 1985), South African photographer
 Frank Marshall (priest) (1946–2017), Dean of Barbados
Frank Marshall (puppeteer) (1900–1969), American puppet maker

See also
 Francis Marshall (disambiguation)